Foss is a common surname of Scandinavian origin. Foss may refer to:

Aage Foss (1885–1952), Danish film actor
Ambrose Foss (c. 1803 – 1862), Australian pharmacist
Anita Foss (born 1921), American baseball player
Betty Foss (1929–1998), American baseball player
Brian Foss (1921-1997), British psychologist
Byron Foss (born 1979), American soccer player
Daniel Foss (born 1940), American sociologist
Charles Calveley Foss (1885–1953), English recipient of the Victoria Cross
Chris Foss (born 1946), British illustrator 
Craig Foss (born 1963), New Zealand politician
Cyrus David Foss (1834–1910), American Methodist bishop 
Dickie Foss (born 1912), English footballer
Donald Foss (born 1945), American billionaire, founder of Credit Acceptance
Edward Foss (1787–1870), English lawyer and biographer
Elith Foss (1911–1972), Danish film actor
Erling Foss (1897–1982), Danish civil engineer
Eugene Foss (1858–1939), American politician
Frank Foss (athlete) (1895–1989), American Olympic athlete
Frank H. Foss (1865–1947), American politician
George Foss, British physician, who treated for some time Michael Dillon (see), the first female-to-male transsexual to undergo phalloplasty
George Edmund Foss (1863–1936), American politician
Hans Andersen Foss (1851–1929), American author, newspaper editor and temperance leader
Heidi Foss, Canadian television writer
Henrich Herman Foss (1790–1853), Norwegian naval officer and politician
Henry Foss (1891–1986), American civic leader
Herbert L. Foss (1871–1937), American naval seaman and Medal of Honor recipient
Hubert J. Foss (1899–1953), English music publisher, pianist and composer
Hugh Foss (1902–1971), British cryptographer
Hugh Foss (bishop) (1848-1932), Anglican bishop
Ingunn Foss, Norwegian politician
Joe Foss (1915–2003), American general and politician
John W. Foss (born 1933), American general
Julius Foss (1879–1953), Danish composer and musician
Karen Foss (born 1944), American television journalist
Kenelm Foss (1885-1963), British actor, screenwriter and film director
Kurt Foss (1925–1991), Norwegian composer, singer and vaudeville artist
Larry Foss (born 1936), American baseball pitcher
Leif O. Foss (1899–1982), Norwegian trade unionist and politician 
Lukas Foss (1922–2009), American composer and conductor
Martin Foss (1889–1968), German-born American philosopher, father of Lukas
Nicolai J. Foss, Danish economist
Nils Foss (born 1928), Danish director and civil engineer
Per-Kristian Foss (born 1950), Norwegian politician
Peter Foss (born 1946), Australian politician
Phillip O. Foss (1916–2001), American political scientist
Richard Foss, American journalist and science fiction author
Rodney Shelton Foss (1919–1941), United States naval officer 
Sam Walter Foss (1858–1911), American librarian and poet
Thea Foss (1857–1927), Norwegian-American businessperson
Thore Torkildsen Foss (1841–1913), Norwegian politician
Tore Foss (1901–1968), Norwegian actor
Wenche Foss (1917-2011), Norwegian actress

See also
Foss (disambiguation)
Fosse (disambiguation)
Voss (surname)
Vos (surname)

Danish-language surnames
Norwegian-language surnames